Kiki, Love to Love is a 2016 Spanish sex comedy film directed by Paco León. It is a remake of the Australian film The Little Death.

Cast

Production 
Penned by Paco León and Fernando Pérez, the screenplay is a remake of the 2014 Australian film The Little Death by Josh Lawson. The film is a Telecinco Cinema and Vértigo Films production, and it had the participation of Mediaset España and Movistar+. Shooting started on 10 August 2015 in Madrid.

Release 
Distributed by Vértigo Films, the film was theatrically released on 1 April 2016.

Reception 
Jonathan Holland of The Hollywood Reporter summed up the film as "feel-good fun, interestingly twisted".

Andrea G. Bermejo of Cinemanía rated the film 4 out of 5 stars, finding (positively) surprising "the elegance with which Paco León tells his stories, the warm photography, the comedy, and the careful aesthetics of the film".

Accolades 

|-
| rowspan = "9" align = "center" | 2017
| rowspan = "4" | 4th Feroz Awards || colspan = "2" | Best Comedy Film ||  || rowspan = "4" | 
|-
| Best Supporting Actress || Candela Peña || 
|-
| Best Trailer || Rafael Martínez || 
|-
| Best Film Poster || Álvaro León Acosta, Luis León Acosta, Virginia Velasco Ramírez || 
|-
| rowspan = "4" | 31st Goya Awards || Best Adapted Screenplay || Fernando Pérez, Paco León ||  || rowspan = "4" | 
|-
| Best Supporting Actress || Candela Peña || 
|-
| Best New Actress || Belén Cuesta || 
|-
| Best Original Song || "KIKI" - Mr.K! feat Nita; composed by Alejandro Acosta, Cristina Manjón, David Borràs Paronella, Marc Peña Rius, Paco León || 
|-
| 26th Actors and Actresses Union Awards || Best Film Actress in a Secondary Role || Candela Peña ||  || 
|}

See also 
 List of Spanish films of 2016

References

External links 

Spanish sex comedy films
Spanish remakes of foreign films
Remakes of Australian films
2010s sex comedy films
2016 comedy films
Telecinco Cinema films
Films produced by Álvaro Augustin
Films produced by Ghislain Barrois
Films shot in Madrid
2010s Spanish-language films
2010s Spanish films